The Spanish Wall is the deteriorating remnant of Spanish Fort Alphonso XIII in Kolonia, the capital of Pohnpei State in the Federated States of Micronesia. The wall was built by Spanish administrators of Pohnpei in 1887 after a local uprising drove the local Spanish authorities onto a ship in the harbor. Most of the wall was taken down by the German administration that took over in the early 20th century, after the Spanish–American War.

The wall was listed on the United States National Register of Historic Places in 1974, a time when Pohnpei was part of the US-administered Trust Territory of the Pacific Islands.

References

National Register of Historic Places in the Federated States of Micronesia
Buildings and structures completed in 1887
Pohnpei